Most Holy Family Monastery (also stylized as MHFM) is a non-profit sedevacantist Feeneyite Catholic organization, based in Fillmore, New York. It is headed by two brothers, Brothers Michael and Peter Dimond. MHFM is known for its persistent defense of Feeneyism and their criticism of the Catholic doctrine of baptism of desire.

According to a spokesperson for the Diocese of Buffalo the monastery is neither affiliated with the diocese nor the Roman Catholic Church. In 1999, the Catholic League, in its annual report on anti-Catholicism, described MHFM as "a dissident organization that challenges[...] papal authority", reporting the monastery's publication of a pamphlet entitled "101 Heresies of Anti-Pope John Paul II". The group has also been condemned by the Catholic diocese of Lincoln, Nebraska.

History
The founder of Most Holy Family Monastery was Joseph Natale (1933-1995), who needed crutches to walk ever after contracting tuberculosis of the bone at the age of four. Natale entered the Saint Vincent Archabbey in Latrobe, Pennsylvania, in 1960 as a lay postulant, but left less than a year later to lay the groundwork for his own religious community. According to an archivist of Saint Vincent Archabbey, Natale left before taking vows; he never actually became a Benedictine monk.

In 1967, a benefactor helped Natale to purchase a property in Berlin, New Jersey to found a community there together with seven other men with disabilities. However, as there was only a small house there at the time and these men were unable to assist with the construction, Natale sent them away until the monastery could be finished. In subsequent years, Natale's vision for the institution changed. Natale started focusing more on what he perceived as guarding the Catholic religion against acts of the Church's hierarchy which Natale regarded as destructive of "the light of true Catholicism", such as the suppression of the Tridentine Mass and permission for use of natural family planning. By the mid-1970s, the monastery had broken off entirely from the institutional Church.

The monastery's chapel, named the St. Jude Shrine in honor of the "patron saint of hopeless causes," was blessed and dedicated on June 8, 1980. By 1987, the weekly Mass celebrated in this chapel was drawing about 150 worshipers each Sunday, and Michael Cuneo reported at the time of his visit in mid-1994 that the Sunday Mass was attended by "between two and three hundred people".

Initially incorporated in 1993 as the Queen of Angels Corp, the Most Holy Family Monastery is a New York Domestic Not-For-Profit Corporation under the business type "religious organization".

Natale died in 1995, whereupon Michael Dimond (born Frederick Dimond), was elected his successor as Superior. Michael Dimond had joined in 1992 at the age of 19, after converting to Catholicism four years earlier.

As of 2020, MHFM teaches that no one should receive communion or attend mass at any Catholic parish (including any sedevacantist groups), since they all preach heresies such as the doctrine of baptism of desire. However, they advise their followers to receive the sacrament of confession from Eastern Catholic priests, or from Latin Rite priests ordained before 1968, when the Second Vatican Council changed the rite of ordination for the Latin Church.

Claims of miraculous experience
According to Michael Cuneo, who researched the various traditionalist movements in the USA, Natale claimed that he had the gift of prophecy in these words:

The author lastly quotes Brother Joseph's "apocalyptic" statement near the end of the interview as beginning: "Five years [from 1994] is about all the time the world has left."

Views
Dimond and his associates do not regard the communion of churches which has been headed by Pope John XXIII and his successors as identical with the Catholic Church that was headed by Pope Pius XII and his predecessors, and refer to it as "the Vatican II sect." The Dimonds believe Pope John XXIII, Pope Paul VI, Pope John Paul I, Pope John Paul II, Pope Benedict XVI, and Pope Francis have each been manifest heretics, and therefore incapable of becoming pope.

Michael and Peter Dimond condemn natural family planning (a fertility awareness method for married couples to regulate conception, pregnancy, and birth). The Dimonds regard statements from Catholics condoning natural family planning from before Pius XII as "not infallible or binding" and in conflict with other Catholic teaching that they do consider infallible. The Dimonds' position is noted in the 2010 book Twentieth-Century Global Christianity by Fortress Press, as "an admittedly rare example of contemporary opposition".

The MHFM opposes the doctrines of baptism of desire and baptism of blood, and affirms that "outside the Catholic Church there is absolutely no salvation". The MHFM considers itself to be Feeneyite.

Dimond and his associates consider the Holocaust "[t]he propaganda hoax which has been so effectively used to cement Jewish power and influence in the world, and to silence any questioning of Jewish activities, support for Israel or a Jewish agenda...we work to expose Jewish domination and evil Jewish enterprises in the world, which (one must say) constitute the main power of the secular conspiracy."

Frederick Dimond (Brother Michael) is the author of UFOs: Demonic Activity & Elaborate Hoaxes Meant to Deceive Mankind, published in 2008 by Most Holy Family Monastery.

Sacraments
None of the members of MHFM have been ordained to the priesthood. They believe that the mass of Paul VI, instituted post-Vatican II, is invalid. They also hold that even the Tridentine Mass as permitted by Benedict XVI in his 2007 , is a compromised form of liturgy, because the 1962 Roman Missal that he approved includes changes made by Pope John XXIII, who they believe to be an antipope. Previously, attending the Divine Liturgy at a Byzantine rite Catholic Church, in Rochester, New York, was considered appropriate; MHFM now advise their followers to stay home on Sundays and pray the rosary.

Criticisms

Southern Poverty Law Center listing
The Southern Poverty Law Center has listed MHFM as a hate group by placing them in the category of adherents of "radical traditional Catholicism, or 'integrism'." This category is said to "routinely pillory Jews as 'the perpetual enemy of Christ' and worse, reject the ecumenical efforts of the Vatican, and sometimes even assert that recent popes have all been illegitimate. They are incensed by the liberalizing reforms of the 1962–1965 Second Vatican Council, which condemned hatred for the Jews and rejected the accusation that Jews are collectively responsible for deicide in the form of the crucifixion of Christ."

References

External links
 
 

Sedevacantism
Christian organizations established in 1967
Independent Catholic denominations
Late modern Christian antisemitism
Holocaust denial